Charumathi Raghuraman is an Indian carnatic music violinist.

Early life and tutelage
Charumathi Raghuraman was born to Rama (a Carnatic vocalist) and V. Raghuraman. Born into a family of music connoisseurs, She started to learn playing violin from her mother. She then received formalized training from T. R. Balamani in Mumbai. In 1995, upon T. N. Krishnan's advice, Charumathi became his disciple when she was just 7 years old.  She studied Carnatic vocal music from P. S. Narayanaswamy. She holds a master's degree in Business Administration from Xavier Institute.

Her husband Anantha Krishnan, a grandson of late Palghat Raghu, is a mridangam player.

Performance career
Her first concert was with T. N. Krishnan in 1998 and since she has performed as soloist and accompanist. She has performed in many music festivals and institutions, across India and abroad. Charumathi participated in The Woodford Folk Festival, Australia, in 2011 and in Sacramento Philharmonic Orchestra, USA.

Style
Her musicianship include the rare combination of a pure sound and erudite content. She not only excels in the instrumental technique of the violin but is equally adept in reproducing vocal nuances mellifluously. Charumathi is also a sought after teacher in both violin and vocal.

Awards
 'Outstanding Young Violinist' Award and 'Best Sub Senior Violinist' Award in 2007 & 2009 ‘Best Violinist’ awards for the years 2001, 2002, 2004 and 2006 from Madras Music Academy 
 The Kalki Krishnamurthy Memorial Award in 2016
 ’Ramabhadran Centenary Award’ for the Most Promising Young Musician of the Year 2013 from Tag Corporation, India
 ’Young Achiever award’ from Rotary Club, Madras
 CCR&T, Govt. of India scholarship from the age of ten

References

External links
 Official Website

Indian violinists
Living people
Carnatic violinists
Musicians from Chennai
Year of birth missing (living people)
21st-century violinists